Kanva Reservoir is an artificial lake and tourist attraction  from Bangalore, India, formed by the damming of the Kanva River in an irrigation project.

The Kava Reservoir is an artificial lake located in the Channapatna, a town famous for its wooden toys. It was built in the year 1946 to serve as a source of drinking water for the surrounding areas, as well as for irrigation purposes. The reservoir is formed by a dam built across the Kaveri River, which is one of the largest rivers in South India. The dam and the reservoir have become popular tourist destinations, attracting thousands of visitors every year.

The scenic beauty of the surrounding area, combined with the serenity of the lake, make it a popular picnic spot. Visitors can engage in boating, fishing and other recreational activities. The Kava Reservoir has played a crucial role in the development of the region by providing water for drinking, irrigation and other purposes, and it continues to play an important role in the lives of the people living in the region.

There is a fisheries training and research center near the dam, which was established to train the local residents in fish farming so that they could become economically independent.

The reservoir is surrounded by wooded hills and offers good birdwatching.

A statue of Hanuman has been placed inside the cave.

Kanva Dam 
Kanva Dam was built in 1946 across the Kanva River for irrigation.
This Dam was built with the advice of Sir M Vishveshwarayya,
. It has got scenic natural beauty. Located in Ramnagar District.

References

External links 
 
Photos and Directions: A Campers paradise
Photo blog

Reservoirs in Karnataka
Geography of Ramanagara district
Infrastructure completed in 1946
1946 establishments in India
20th-century architecture in India